= Prime Minister Clark =

Prime Minister Clark may refer to:

- Helen Clark (born 1950), prime minister of New Zealand from 1999 to 2008
- Joe Clark (born 1939), prime minister of Canada from 1979 to 1980
